Distension (spelled distention in many style regimens) generally refers to an enlargement, dilation, or ballooning effect. It may refer to: 

 Abdominal distension, typically a symptom of an underlying disease or dysfunction in the body, rather than an illness in its own right
 Gastric distension, bloating of the stomach when air is pumped into it, as in a medical procedure
 Distention of blood vessels under increased blood pressure; see

See also
 Dissension (disambiguation)